Komorowski is a Polish locational surname, which means a person from Komorowo, which in turn derives from the Old Polish komor or "mosquito". Variants of Komorowski include Komorowska and Komorowsky. The name may refer to:

Andrzej Komorowski (born 1975), Polish Catholic priest
Anna Komorowska (13th century) consort of Polish szlachcic (nobleman) Florian Zamoyski (died 1510)
Anna Komorowska (born 1953), Polish philologist
Anna Maria Komorowska (born 1946), Polish noblewoman
Bronisław Komorowski (born 1952), Polish politician and former President 
Bronisław Komorowski (priest) (1889–1940), Polish priest
Gertruda Komorowska (1754–1771), Polish noblewoman
Liliana Komorowska (born 1956), Polish actress
Maja Komorowska (born 1937), Polish actress
Marcin Komorowski (born 1984), Polish footballer
Stanisław Komorowski (1953–2010), Polish diplomat
Tadeusz Bór-Komorowski (1895–1966), Polish general
Wiktor Komorowski (1887–1952), Polish fighter pilot
Zbigniew Komorowski (born 1977), Polish figure skater

Other uses
Huta Komorowska, Poland
Wólka Komorowska, Poland

References 

Polish-language surnames